Government Medical College, formerly known as Glancy Medical College, was established in 1864 in Lahore, British India and located to Amritsar, India in 1920.

History
In, 1947 India became a separate nation and was partitioned into India and Pakistan. Punjab was divided into East Punjab(India) and West Punjab (Pakistan). During this time GMCA was the only medical college present in Northern India. The college's original name Glancy Medical College was named after the former Governor General of Punjab and was renamed to its current name after independence.

The college is governed by Director Research and Medical Education, Punjab and is affiliated to Baba Farid University of Health Sciences, Faridkot.

Campus 

The college is on the Circular Road and Majitha Road in the holy city of Amritsar and provides training to 250 medical students every year. Besides it also trains post-graduate students in many specialties. The college also provides the B.Sc nursing degree to students for overall welfare of the medical field along with doctorate degrees.

A 9 Storey Bebe Nanki Mother & Child Care Centre and the Guru Teg Bahadur Diagnostic & Superspeciality Complex have been built and attached to the college in the year 2012 with partial funding from Government of India under the Pradhan Mantri Swasthya Suraksha Yojana (PMSSY). 

Two separate complexes for the College of Nursing and the Swami Vivekananda Drug Deaddiction Centre have also been attached to the college.

The Ram Saran Das Prakash Wati Kakkar Children ward, Karam Singh Ward, Sri Guru Teg Bahadur Hospital and Sant Ram Dhall Hospital are no longer parts of Medical College as the land housing these Hospitals has been relocated to other institutes or sold. The departments housed in these hospitals have been shifted to Guru Nanak Dev Hospital, the Bebe Nanki Mother & Child Centre and the Guru Teg Bahadur Diagnostic and Super-specialty Complex.

Affiliated hospitals
 Guru Nanak Dev Hospital
 Sri Guru Teg Bahadur Hospital
 Bebe Nanaki Centre for Mother & Child Care
 SGTB Trauma Center
 Ram Lal Eye and ENT Hospital
 TB & Chest Diseases Hospital
 Swami Vivekananda Deaddiction Center

External links
 Official GMC, Amritsar Webpage
 Amritsar Medical & Dental Alumni Association of North America
 Amritsar Medical College Alumni Association (India)
 

Medical colleges in Punjab, India
Education in Amritsar
Science and technology in Amritsar
Educational institutions established in 1864
1864 establishments in India